The year 1904 in archaeology involved some significant events.

Events
 March 18 – Ancient Monuments Preservation Act 1904 passed in British India.

Explorations
 Leo Frobenius makes an expedition to the Kasai region of the Belgian Congo.

Excavations
 Edward Herbert Thompson dredges artifacts from the Sacred Cenote at Chichen Itza.
 First formal excavations at Aphrodisias in Anatolia, by French railroad engineer Paul Augustin Gaudin, begin.
 Oseberg ship.

Finds
 Tomb of Nefertari discovered by Ernesto Schiaparelli.
 Winter 1904–5 – Inscription in a form of Proto-Sinaitic script, dated to the mid-19th century BCE, discovered in Sinai by Hilda and Flinders Petrie.
 Approximate date – Broe helmet.

Publications
 Rudolf Ernst Brünnow and Alfred von Domaszewski begin publication of Die Provincia Arabia, containing a detailed description of Petra.

Births
 January 19 – Pei Wenzhong, founding father of Chinese anthropology (died 1982).
 February 11 – Alan Sorrell, English archaeological illustrator (died 1974).
 May 6 – Max Mallowan, English archaeologist (died 1978).

Deaths
 March – Alexander Stuart Murray, Scottish archaeologist and museum curator (born 1841).
 November 20 – Luigi Palma di Cesnola, Italian American soldier, diplomat, archaeologist and museum director (born 1832)

References

Archaeology
Archaeology
Archaeology by year